Robert Esmie (born July 5, 1972) is a Canadian retired sprinter, who was a member of the gold medal-winning Canadian 4 × 100 m relay team at the 1996 Summer Olympics.

Born in Kingston, Jamaica, and raised in Sudbury, Ontario, Esmie was part, along with Glenroy Gilbert, Bruny Surin and Donovan Bailey, of a 4 × 100 m relay team in the mid-1990s. They were number one in the world from 1994 to 1999.

Esmie placed seventh (10.23) in the second semi-final of the 100 m and won a bronze medal in the 4 × 100 m relay at the 1993 World Championships. At the 1994 Commonwealth Games, he competed in the 100 metres.

Esmie won a bronze medal in the 60 m at the 1995 World Indoor Championships and was again a member of gold medal-winning Canadian 4 × 100 m relay team at the 1995 World Championships.

At the Atlanta Olympics the Canadian men's 4×100 relay team was not favored despite winning most high-profile titles in the previous three years, including the 1995 World Championships. Leading up to the Olympics, the United States team of Jon Drummond, Tim Harden, Michael Marsh and Dennis Mitchell claimed they would beat Canada; however, in the 4×100 relay final the Canadian team beat the United States by almost half a second to win the gold in national record time. Esmie was not originally slated to run with the relay team due to politics; while Esmie was ranked third in Canada before the relay began but as the team was falling apart they decided to replace Carlton Chambers the night before the race after Chambers suffered a groin injury in the 200 m.

Esmie's gold medal was later stolen.

Esmie and the Canadian team won a gold medal again from lane 8 at the 1997 World Championships.

In 2008 he was inducted into Canada's Sports Hall of Fame as part of the 1996 Summer Olympics 4×100 relay team.

Esmie now runs AirBlastoff Sports, an athletic training program.

References

External links
 
 
 
 
 
 

1972 births
Athletes (track and field) at the 1994 Commonwealth Games
Athletes (track and field) at the 1996 Summer Olympics
Black Canadian track and field athletes
Canadian male sprinters
Commonwealth Games competitors for Canada
Jamaican emigrants to Canada
Living people
Sportspeople from Kingston, Jamaica
Naturalized citizens of Canada
Olympic gold medalists for Canada
Olympic track and field athletes of Canada
Sportspeople from Greater Sudbury
Track and field athletes from Ontario
World Athletics Championships athletes for Canada
World Athletics Championships medalists
World Athletics Indoor Championships medalists
Medalists at the 1996 Summer Olympics
Olympic gold medalists in athletics (track and field)
World Athletics Championships winners